Unity Village may refer to:

Unity Village, Guyana
Unity Village, Missouri, United States